Kirsty Hume (born 4 September 1976) is a Scottish model who came to prominence in the 1990s.

Modeling
Hume modelled for Dior, Givenchy, Chanel, Lanvin, Yves Saint Laurent, Christian Lacroix, Gianfranco Ferré, Claude Montana, Alexander McQueen, Giorgio Armani, Gianni Versace, Roberto Cavalli, Prada, Calvin Klein, Ralph Lauren, Oscar de la Renta, Jaeger (clothing) and Donna Karan.  She also frequently appeared on the covers of Harper's Bazaar, photographed by Patrick Demarchelier, as well as Vogue, W and other publications.

In 1996 Hume was the feature model for Chanel ads. She has modelled for Victoria's Secret. For the March 1996 Gucci presentation of fall and winter fashion collections in Milan, Hume wore a dress made of white jersey (clothing) with a plunging neckline.

Following a showing of Karl Lagerfeld designs for Chanel in 1997 in Paris, Hume was queried by a Russian TV reporter. He asked her what was the most exciting part of her job. She answered, "Um, the money."

Personal life
Hume attended Wellington School, Ayr.

Hume married rocker and actor Donovan Leitch in Scotland in 1997. After getting married, they drove around Bali in a jeep. The couple have a daughter named Violet (born 2004).

Hume and Leitch eschewed city life and relocated to Woodstock, New York but separated in 2011 and divorced in 2014. She has studied painting and paganism.

Appearances
Hume starred in an interactive fashion art film by Imagine Fashion called, "Decadent Control" with Roberto Cavalli and Eva Herzigová. The film features fashion from Agent Provocateur and H&M and premiered in March 2011.

References

External links
Fashion Model Directory profile
Kirsty Hume features in Agent Provocateur advertising campaign
Kirsty Hume in fashion art film "Decadent Control"

1976 births
Living people
People educated at Wellington School, Ayr
Scottish female models
Scottish expatriates in the United States
People from Ayrshire